Sujay Vikhe Patil is an Indian politician and member of the 17th Lok Sabha, representing Ahmednagar constituency, Maharashtra. He is a member of the Bharatiya Janata Party. He contested his first election of his political career in 2019 of Lok Sabha and he is elected by huge voting margin of 2,81,526 votes against NCP candidate.

He is the grand son of veteran politician and seven time Member of Parliament, former Union Minister of State (Finance), and Union Cabinet Minister (Heavy Industries) Govt. of India, Balasaheb Vikhe Patil.

References 
2. Sujay Vikhe Patil And Parth Pawar in one aeroplane   Akole News

Balasaheb Vikhe PatilRadhakrishna Vikhe Patil

India MPs 2019–present
Lok Sabha members from Maharashtra
Living people
Bharatiya Janata Party politicians from Maharashtra
Year of birth missing (living people)
People from Ahmednagar